András Zsinka (born 19 October 1947) is a Hungarian middle-distance runner. He competed in the men's 800 metres at the 1972 Summer Olympics.

References

1947 births
Living people
Athletes (track and field) at the 1972 Summer Olympics
Hungarian male middle-distance runners
Olympic athletes of Hungary
Place of birth missing (living people)
20th-century Hungarian people